Greg Suran is the lead guitarist in the B-52s, a role he has performed since 2013. He replaced Keith Strickland on the road after Strickland announced in December 2012 that he would no longer be touring with the B-52s but would continue as a member of the band.

Before that, Suran had performed and toured with Joe Walsh, Mylene Farmer, Liz Phair, Jewel, Sunny Day Real Estate, and others.

He plays guitar and mandolin, and sings backing vocals.

Education
 Bachelor of Music, Northwestern University, Evanston, Illinois, June 19, 1993

Career

Greg Suran is a guitarist and composer from Chicago, Illinois, now residing in Los Angeles.

He majored in classical guitar performance while also studying composition and arranging at Northwestern University in Evanston, Illinois, near his birthplace.

Throughout his life, though, Suran had played in well-known rock bands, including Sunny Day Real Estate, The Goo Goo Dolls (2002-2007), Machines of Loving Grace, Local H, Cupcakes (a band he formed), which released an album on Dreamworks Records.  He has also recorded and/or toured with a diverse range of pop artists such as Avril Lavigne, Liz Phair, Five For Fighting, Colbie Caillat, and Jewel. He has recorded guitar on feature film scores/soundtracks such as Rent, Treasure Planet, and Biker Boyz. Suran had worked as a musician in theater for many years with the Blue Man Group and a production of Hedwig and the Angry Inch.

He toured with Joe Walsh from 2011-2013 on the "Analog Man" tour, then also for two tours with French pop star Mylene Farmer in 2009 and 2013, then also with Don Felder, formerly of the Eagles, from 2013–present.

He worked as a session player and touring musician in Los Angeles until he joined the B-52s in 2013, after Keith Strickland left, with which group he is currently touring in the USA.  He has also been a guitarist in the house band for the television show, American Idol, for four seasons since its reboot on ABC in 2018.

Personal life

For two years, by his own report, he has practiced a vegan diet.

Albums
 Glee - The 3D Concert Movie [OST] (CD), with several other artists, 08/09/2011.
 Cupcakes
 Goo Goo Dolls - Gutterflower
 Goo Goo Dolls - Live in Buffalo
 Goo Goo Dolls - Let Love In
 Jewel - Goodbye Alice In Wonderland
 Jeremy Enigk - World Waits
 Colbie Caillat - Breakthrough
 Five For Fighting - Slice
 Avril Lavigne - Best Damn Thing
 BackStreet Boys - Never Gone
 Jen Wood - Wilderness

References

External links
 Cinecue profile for Greg Suran

The B-52's members
American new wave musicians
Living people
Bienen School of Music alumni
Northwestern University alumni
Year of birth missing (living people)